Gutenberg is a German surname. Notable people with the surname include:

Beno Gutenberg (1889–1960), German-born seismologist
Erich Gutenberg (1897–1984), German economist
Johannes Gutenberg (c. 1398–1468), German printer and publisher

See also 
 Guttenberg (disambiguation)
 Gutenburg (disambiguation)

German-language surnames